The 6th Mountain Huntsmen Company is a unit of the Argentine Army specialised in Mountain warfare. The Company is based at based Primeros Pinos, Neuquén Province. This unit is part of the 6th Mountain Infantry Brigade. The troops and soldiers of this unit wear a tan beret with unit insignia.

External links 
 Official website
 Organization and equipment
 Argentine Infantry Official website

See also
Mountain warfare
6th Mountain Infantry Brigade
Cazadores de Montaña

Army units and formations of Argentina
Mountain units and formations